This is a list of all public library systems in Georgia, United States, serviced under the Georgia Public Library Service. Georgia has 62 library systems consisting of 387 branches serving its 159 counties. Out of these, 284 libraries are serviced by the state-wide library system PINES.

See also

List of Carnegie libraries in Georgia
Georgia Library Learning Online
Digital Library of Georgia

References

External links
Georgia Public Library Service
PINES

 
Georgia